Christian Dyot (born 24 February 1959) is a French judoka. He competed in the men's lightweight event at the 1980 Summer Olympics.

References

External links
 

1959 births
Living people
French male judoka
Olympic judoka of France
Judoka at the 1980 Summer Olympics
Place of birth missing (living people)